In mathematics, a subset of a topological space is called nowhere dense or rare if its closure has empty interior.  In a very loose sense, it is a set whose elements are not tightly clustered (as defined by the topology on the space) anywhere.  For example, the integers are nowhere dense among the reals, whereas an open ball is not.

A countable union of nowhere dense sets is called a meagre set. Meagre sets play an important role in the formulation of the Baire category theorem, which is used in the proof of several fundamental result of functional analysis.

Definition 

Density nowhere can be characterized in different (but equivalent) ways.  The simplest definition is the one from density:

Definition by closure 

The second definition above is equivalent to requiring that the closure,  cannot contain any nonempty open set.

Properties 

The notion of nowhere dense set is always relative to a given surrounding space.  Suppose  where  has the subspace topology induced from   The set  may be nowhere dense in  but not nowhere dense in   Notably, a set is always dense in its own subspace topology.  So if  is nonempty, it will not be nowhere dense as a subset of itself.  However the following results hold:
 If  is nowhere dense in  then  is nowhere dense in 

A set is nowhere dense if and only if its closure is.

Every subset of a nowhere dense set is nowhere dense, and a finite union of nowhere dense sets is nowhere dense.  Thus the nowhere dense sets form an ideal of sets, a suitable notion of negligible set.  In general they do not form a 𝜎-ideal, as meager sets, which are the countable unions of nowhere dense sets, need not be nowhere dense.  For example, the set  is not nowhere dense in 

The boundary of every open set and of every closed set is closed and nowhere dense.  A closed set is nowhere dense if and only if it is equal to its boundary, if and only if it is equal to the boundary of some open set (for example the open set can be taken as the complement of the set).  An arbitrary set  is nowhere dense if and only if it is a subset of the boundary of some open set (for example the open set can be taken as the exterior of ).

Examples 

 The set  and its closure  are nowhere dense in  since the closure has empty interior.
  viewed as the horizontal axis in the Euclidean plane is nowhere dense in 
  is nowhere dense in  but the rationals  are not (they are dense everywhere).
  is  nowhere dense in : it is dense in the open interval  and in particular the interior of its closure is 
 The empty set is nowhere dense.  In a discrete space, the empty set is the  nowhere dense set.
 In a T1 space, any singleton set that is not an isolated point is nowhere dense.
 A vector subspace of a topological vector space is either dense or nowhere dense.

Nowhere dense sets with positive measure 

A nowhere dense set is not necessarily negligible in every sense.  For example, if  is the unit interval  not only is it possible to have a dense set of Lebesgue measure zero (such as the set of rationals), but it is also possible to have a nowhere dense set with positive measure.

For one example (a variant of the Cantor set), remove from  all dyadic fractions, i.e. fractions of the form  in lowest terms for positive integers  and the intervals around them:  
Since for each  this removes intervals adding up to at most  the nowhere dense set remaining after all such intervals have been removed has measure of at least  (in fact just over  because of overlaps) and so in a sense represents the majority of the ambient space  
This set is nowhere dense, as it is closed and has an empty interior: any interval  is not contained in the set since the dyadic fractions in  have been removed.

Generalizing this method, one can construct in the unit interval nowhere dense sets of any measure less than  although the measure cannot be exactly 1 (because otherwise the complement of its closure would be a nonempty open set with measure zero, which is impossible).

(here, the Minkowski sum notation  was used to simplify the description of the intervals). 
The open subset  is dense in  because this is true of its subset  and its Lebesgue measure is no greater than  
Taking the union of closed, rather than open, intervals produces the F-subset

that satisfies  Because  is a subset of the nowhere dense set  it is also nowhere dense in  
Because  is a Baire space, the set

See also

References

Bibliography

External links 

 Some nowhere dense sets with positive measure

General topology

de:Dichte Teilmenge#Nirgends dichte Teilmenge